The L'Hospitalet Pioners ("L'Hospitalet Pioneers") are a gridiron football team based in L'Hospitalet de Llobregat, Catalonia (Spain).

History
Their nickname recalls the history of the team, as they are one of the pioneering teams to play gridiron in Spain, together with Badalona Drags, Poblenou Búfals and Barcelona Boxers (defunct). The four teams played in 1988 the first Spanish championship.

Titles
Spanish League (6): 2005, 2008, 2010, 2011, 2012, 2013.
Spanish Cup (9): 2000, 2005, 2006, 2008, 2010, 2011, 2012, 2013, 2014.

References

External links
Official website L´Hospitalet Pioners

American football teams in Catalonia
Sport in L'Hospitalet de Llobregat
1988 establishments in Spain
American football teams established in 1988